National Route 492 is a national highway of Japan connecting between Takamatsu, Kagawa and Ōtoyo, Kōchi in Japan. It has a total length of 166.9 km (103.79 mi).

References

492
Roads in Kagawa Prefecture
Roads in Kōchi Prefecture
Roads in Tokushima Prefecture